Bryan Station is a neighborhood in Northeast Lexington, Kentucky, United States. It is named after the nearby pioneer settlement by the same name located just 2 miles (3 km) outside the current edge of the city.

The neighborhood's boundaries are New Circle Road to the West, Old Paris Pike to the North, and  Preakness Drive and Interstate 75 to the East. An abandoned railroad track between New Circle Road and I-75 separates it from the Eastland neighborhood to the South.

Neighborhood statistics
 Area: 
 Population: 5,323
 Population density: 2,645 people per square mile
 Median household income: $49,678.

See also

Bryan Station High School

References

Neighborhoods in Lexington, Kentucky